Walter Burleigh may refer to:

 Walter Burley, medieval English philosopher
 Walter A. Burleigh, American physician and lawyer
 Walter Burley Griffin, American architect